"Paper Mansions" is a song written by Ted Harris, recorded by American country music artist by Dottie West.  The single was first a 45 RPM.  It was released in February 1967 as the first single from her  With All My Heart and Soul album (which sold quite well). This song was West's last Top 10 hit of the decade as a solo act. This song is an example of one of the few songs not written by West herself. The song was the last single released in 1967 and became a Top 10 hit in 1968, reaching No. 8 on the Hot Country Songs list on Billboard's chart. It didn't do as well on Cashbox's chart, only making the Top 15 there, at No. 13.

This song is one of West's better-known hits from the 1960s. This was virtually impossible to find on any Dottie West album until 1996, when RCA records released a compilation album of all her hits under RCA titled The Essential Dottie West. Lynn Anderson released a recording of this song on her album Promises, Promises.

Charts

References

1967 singles
Dottie West songs
RCA Records singles
1967 songs